Haras du Mezeray is a French Thoroughbred horse breeding farm located at Ticheville, Orne, in the Lower Normandy region of France. A  property, it was founded in 1962 by prominent horseman, Paul de Moussac (1924–1995). The operation maintains one hundred horse stalls and a pre-training center suitable for all-weather galloping.

Now run by Charles-Henri de Moussac, Haras du Mezeray has maintained up to seventy mares and its current stallion roster includes Ballingarry, Muhtathir, and Trempolino.

Since its founding, Haras du Mezeray has produced notable horses such as Prix de l'Arc de Triomphe winners Trempolino (1987) and Subotica (1992), 1988 Arlington Million winner Mill Native, and in Kentucky, Artie Schiller, winner of the 2005 Breeders' Cup Mile.

References
 Official website for Haras du Mezeray (French language)
 Haras du Mezeray at the NTRA

External links
Agricultural Video Surveillance Livestock Farm

French racehorse owners and breeders
Horse farms in France
Buildings and structures in Orne